Parc Trostre is a retail park in Llanelli, Carmarthenshire, Wales.

The first phase of the development occurred in 1988, consisting of stores such as Tesco. In September 2008, the growing popularity of the retail park led Llanelli Town Council to express concern at the increasing adverse impact which the continued expansion of Parc Trostre is having on Llanelli town centre.

References

External links 
 http://www.parctrostreretailpark.co.uk Official Website
 Map of Parc Trostre locality
 Parc Trostre Retail Park on CompletelyRetail
 

Shopping centres in Wales
Buildings and structures in Llanelli